James Earl Files (born January 24, 1942), also known as James Sutton, is an American former prisoner. In 1994, while serving a 50-year sentence for the 1991 attempted murders of two police officers, Files gave interviews stating that he was the "grassy knoll shooter" in the 1963 assassination of United States President John F. Kennedy. Files has subsequently been interviewed by others and discussed in multiple books pertaining to the assassination and related theories. In 1994, the Federal Bureau of Investigation was quoted as having investigated Files' allegation and found it "not to be credible".

In 2010, Playboy magazine published an article by Hillel Levin in which Files also implicated Charles Nicoletti and John Roselli in the assassination of Kennedy. In 2022 Ted Nelson posted a video interview with Files on his Youtube channel.

Background

Files has stated that he was born in Alabama, moved to California with his family shortly thereafter, then to an Italian neighborhood in Chicago. On May 7, 1991, Files and his friend, David Morley, were involved in a roadside shootout in Round Lake Beach, Illinois, with two police officers, Detective David Ostertag and his partner, Gary Bitler. Ostertag and Bitler tried to apprehend the two for driving a stolen vehicle. During the shootout, Morley shot Detective Ostertag in the chest. Both Files and Morley shot at Detective Bitler but missed. Files and Morley then fled on foot but were arrested a few hours later. Files was charged with two counts of attempted murder and one count each of discharge of a firearm, aggravated battery with a firearm and armed violence. In August 1991, a jury found Files guilty of two counts of attempted murder. He was sentenced to 30 years for the shooting of Detective Ostertag and 20 years for attempting to shoot Detective Bitler. Files was initially imprisoned at Stateville Correctional Center in Crest Hill, Illinois, before being transferred to Danville Correctional Center in Danville, Illinois. Files was paroled in May 2016.

An "anonymous FBI source", later identified as Zack Shelton, has been reported by some researchers as having told Joe West, a private investigator in Houston, in the early 1990s about an inmate in an Illinois penitentiary who might have information about the Kennedy assassination. On August 17, 1992, West interviewed Files at Stateville Correctional Center in Crest Hill, Illinois. After West's death in 1993, his family requested that his friend, Houston television producer Bob Vernon, take over the records concerning the story. Vernon is the owner of a bullet casing with teeth marks on it, even though it was not found until 1987.

Critical analysis
Vincent Bugliosi, author of Reclaiming History: The Assassination of President John F. Kennedy, has characterized Files as "the Rodney Dangerfield of Kennedy assassins."  According to Bugliosi, very few within the majority of Americans (75%) who believe there was a conspiracy to kill Kennedy respect him or his story. However, psychology professor Jerome Kroth described Files as "surprisingly credible" and said his story "is the most believable and persuasive" about the assassination.

Notes

References

1942 births
Living people
People associated with the assassination of John F. Kennedy
People from Walker County, Alabama
People from California
People from Chicago
Prisoners and detainees of Illinois